Pseudogonatodes manessi is a species of lizard in the family Sphaerodactylidae. The species is endemic to Venezuela.

Etymology
The specific name, manessi is in honor of American herpetologist Scott Jay Maness (1948–1981), who died fighting a wildfire in Florida.

Geographic range
P. manessi is found in the Venezuelan states of Aragua and Miranda.

Description
Dorsally, it is dark brown. Ventrally, it is dark gray.

Reproduction
P. manessi is oviparous.

References

Further reading
Avila-Pires TCS, Hoogmoed MS (2000). "On two new species of Pseudogonatodes Ruthven, 1915 (Reptilia: Squamata: Gekkonidae), with remarks on the distribution of some other sphaerodactyl lizards". Zoologische Mededelingen, Leiden 73 (12): 209–223. (Pseudogonatodes manessi, new species, pp. 214–219, Figures 3–5). (in English with an abstract in Spanish).

Pseudogonatodes
Reptiles of Venezuela
Endemic fauna of Venezuela
Reptiles described in 2000
Taxa named by Teresa C.S. Ávila-Pires
Taxa named by Marinus Steven Hoogmoed